Conestoga-Rovers & Associates (CRA) is a group of companies that provides engineering, environmental consulting, construction, and information technology (IT) services.  On July 2, 2014 CRA became a division of the GHD Group.  Its current overall headquarters is located in Waterloo, Ontario, however the firm has locations in multiple countries with a separate headquarters in each. Their U.S. headquarters resides in Niagara Falls, New York where the company's seminal project, the Love Canal, took place.

History

Love Canal

The Love Canal Landfill, one of the pinnacle environmental projects in US history, was an open trench that was filled with hazardous chlorinated organic wastes from a chemical plant in Niagara Falls, NY, during the 1940s and 1950s.  A residential area and elementary school were constructed immediately adjacent to the former three-block landfill in the 1960s, resulting in an environmental disaster that eventually prompted the initiation of the Superfund Legislation in the United States.

CRA's involvement at Love Canal began in 1977, shortly after the chemical wastes were discovered in the backyards of homes along the canal. CRA was retained to investigate the chemical presence and develop a plan to address the issues.  CRA developed an understanding of the hydrogeology and chemical presence, designed a remedial plan, and provided construction oversight for its implementation.  CRA continues to be involved in the operation, maintenance, and monitoring for this project to this day.

The company merged with GHD Group in 2014.

Units
 Conestoga-Rovers & Associates
 CRA Contractors Limited
 CRA Developments Limited
 CRA Engineering Group Inc.
 Conestoga-Rovers & Associates (Europe) Ltd.
 CRA Infrastructure & Engineering
 eSolutionsGroup
 HSA Engineers & Scientists
 Inspec-Sol
 SECRA Inc.

References

External links
 Corporate Website
 CRA Europe Corporate Website

Construction and civil engineering companies of Canada
Companies based in Waterloo, Ontario
Construction and civil engineering companies established in 1976
1976 establishments in Ontario
Canadian companies established in 1976
Love Canal